The Italian regional elections of 1970 were held on 7 and 8 June. Even if the regional system was conceived by the Italian Constitution in 1948, the five autonomous regions were the sole to be immediately established. The fifteen ordinary regions were indeed created in 1970 with the first elections.

Electoral system
The pure party-list proportional representation had traditionally become the electoral system of Italy, and it was adopted for the regional vote too. Each Italian province corresponded to a constituency electing a group of candidates. At constituency level, seats were divided between open lists using the largest remainder method with Droop quota. Remaining votes and seats were transferred at regional level, where they were divided using the Hare quota, and automatically distributed to best losers into the local lists.

Results summary

Twelve Regional Councils elected an administration led by Christian Democracy in a centrist alliance, while Emilia-Romagna, Umbria and Tuscany chose a leftist administration, the first two regions led by the PCI and the other one by the PSI.

Results by region
1970 Abruzzo regional election
1970 Apulian regional election
1970 Basilicata regional election
1970 Calabrian regional election
1970 Campania regional election
1970 Emilia-Romagna regional election
1970 Lazio regional election
1970 Ligurian regional election
1970 Lombard regional election
1970 Marche regional election
1970 Molise regional election
1970 Piedmontese regional election
1970 Tuscan regional election
1970 Umbrian regional election
1970 Venetian regional election

External links 

1970 elections in Italy
Elections in Italian regions
June 1970 events in Europe